Dąbrowa  is a settlement in the administrative district of Gmina Myślibórz, within Myślibórz County, West Pomeranian Voivodeship, in north-western Poland. It is part of the sołectwo of Rościn.

References

Villages in Myślibórz County